Bronchocela danieli, also known commonly as Daniel's bloodsucker and Daniel's forest lizard, is a species of lizard in the family Agamidae. The species is endemic to Campbell Bay, Great Nicobar Island, India.

Etymology
The specific name, danieli, is in honor of Indian naturalist Jivanayakam Cyril "J.C." Daniel.

Habitat
The preferred natural habitat of B. danieli is forest.

Behavior
B. danieli is arboreal.

Reproduction
B. danieli is oviparous.

References

Further reading
Biswas S (1984). "Some notes on the reptiles of the Andaman and Nicobar Islands". Journal of the Bombay Natural History Society 81 (2): 476–481.
Das I (1999). "Biogeography of the Amphibians and Reptiles of the Andaman and Nicobar Islands, India". pp. 43–77. In: Ota H (editor) (1999). Tropical Island Herpetofauna: Origin, Current Diversity, and Conservation. Amsterdam: Elsevier Science. 353 pp. .
Murthy TSN (1990).  "A Field Book of the Lizards of India".  Records of the Zoological Survey of India, Occasional Papers (15): 1–122.
Sharma RC (2002).  Fauna of India and the adjacent countries. Reptilia (Sauria). Kolkata [=Calcutta]: Zoological Survey of India.
Tikader BK, Sharma RC (1992).  Handbook of Indian Lizards.  Kolkata: Zoological Survey of India.
Tiwari KK, Biswas S (1973). "Two new reptiles from the great Nicobar Islands".  Journal of the Zoological Society of India 25: 57–63. (Calotes danieli, new species).

External links
Photos from Nicobar and Andaman Islands

Bronchocela
Reptiles of India
Endemic fauna of the Nicobar Islands
Reptiles described in 1973
Taxa named by Sayantan Biswas